Brennabor-Werke AG (previously  Brennabor-Werke Gebr. Reichstein) was a German manufacturer of infant buggies, bicycles, motorcycles and, for two decades, of powered motor vehicles.   It was based in Brandenburg an der Havel and operated between 1871 and 1945.

History 

The company was set up in 1871 by three brothers named Adolf, Carl and Hermann Reichstein.   The brothers had already been producing basket-work child buggies and children's two-wheelers in 1870, and in 1881 had moved into the booming mainstream bicycle business.   From 1892 the bicycles were branded with the Brennabor name.

By the 1930s the company had grown to become Europe's largest produced of infant buggies and was also a leading bicycle producer.
Volume production of motor bikes began in 1901, and from 1903 the company was producing, at this stage only to special order, three- and four-wheeled powered vehicles.   1908 saw the beginning of series production of cars, and this was also the year that the company's own racing team began to enjoy worldwide success in motor sport.   However, car production was suspended in 1914 with the outbreak of the First World War, while motor bike production was ended in 1916.

After the war, in 1919, the company presented the Brennabor Typ P, a car targeted at the upper middle classes, and volume production began in 1921.   In  1924 Brennabor was employing approximately 6,000 people.  During the mid-1920s Brennabor became Germany's largest car producer, and it was still in second place, behind Opel, in 1927/28.

In 1919 the company formed an alliance with two other manufacturers, NAG and Hansa-Lloyd, the resulting tripartite grouping being known as GDA (Gemeinschaft Deutscher Automobilfabriken /Association of German Carmakers).   The association lasted until 1928 but never progressed to the point of becoming a formal merger between the member companies.

In 1923/24 Brennabor led the way, as one of the first German auto-makers (along with Opel) to adopt US-style production line techniques.   However, Brennabor had no small car model to compete with Opel's Laubfrosch.   The German economy was particularly badly hit by the world economic crisis of the 1920s, and the company saw demand and production volumes cut back at the end of the decade.

The company attempted a comeback in 1931, applying developments in front-wheel drive technology, using the Voran company's patent, but this led only to a prototype based on the company's six-cylinder Juwel 6 model. There was insufficient funding for any progression to volume production of any front-wheel-drive model.   1932 saw an eight-month hiatus in automobile production: production resumed at the end of the autumn, but came to a permanent end in 1933.
The company continued as a producer of components and motor bikes until 1945, and also produced armaments during the Second World War, but its history came to an abrupt halt in 1945 when it found itself in the Soviet Occupation Zone and the plant was disassembled.

In the later 1940s the site would later be taken over and used for the creation of a Heavy tractor factory, in which form it continued till the 1960s.   Since 1991 the former factory has housed a training centre owned by a subsidiary of the auto-engineering company, ZF Group.

Brennabor cars

References 
 Werner Oswald: Deutsche Autos Band 2 – 1920–1945. 2. Neuauflage, Motorbuch Verlag, Stuttgart 2005, 
 Archiv Mario Steinbrink, Interessengemeinschaft Brennabor, www.brennabor-brb.de
 Pavel/Krause/Brekow: Von Brennabor bis ZF Brandenburg. Eine Industriegeschichte. Brandenburgisches Verlagshaus, 1996, 
 Stapf/Reichstein: Brennabor. Vom Korbmacher zum Autokönig. Aus dem Leben der Industriellen-Familie Reichstein 1839–1971 Kerschsteiner Verlag, 2005,

External links 
 Interessengemeinschaft Brennabor
  Information on some  Brennabort two-wheelers, with photos

 
Defunct motor vehicle manufacturers of Germany
Vehicle manufacturing companies established in 1871
Vehicle manufacturing companies disestablished in 1945
Car manufacturers of Germany
Motorcycle manufacturers of Germany
Babycare
Baby products
Cycle manufacturers of Germany
Companies of Prussia
1871 establishments in Germany
1945 disestablishments in Germany